Toruń Regional Museum, located in the Ratusz hall of Toruń, is one of the oldest and largest museums in Poland. It started in 1594 as the mere Cabinet of Curiosities at the library of the academic Gimnazjum, called Musaeum in Latin. Re-established in sovereign Poland as a city museum in 1920 after the century of military partitions, it was administratively structured as the regional museum in 1965.

Departments
The Museum consists of 7 departments.

The headquarters and main department of the museum is located in the Old Town Hall. It is divided into:
 Skrwilno and Nieszawa Treasure
 Court Room (XVI-XVII century)
 Gothic Art Room (painting, sculpture)
 Old Toruń: History and Crafts (from 1233 to 1793)
 Sacral Art of Modern Toruń
 The Mieszczańska Room with one of the earliest portraits of Nicolaus Copernicus
 The Royal Hall
 Gallery of Polish Art
 Gallery of Polish Art (after 1945)
 Militaria (from antiquity to the twentieth century)
 Archaeological exhibition (from 1100 BC to 1300 BC)
 Temporary exhibitions

Other departments are:
Copernicus House at the birthplace and childhood home of the famed astronomer at Kopernika 15/17 Street
Museum of History of Toruń in the Esken House (Dom Eskenów) at Łazienna 16 Street
Museum of Toruń Gingerbread at Strumykowa 4
Toruń Fortress Museum at Wały Generała Sikorskiego 23/25 Street
Museum of Far Eastern Art in the House Under the Star (Kamienica Pod Gwiazdą) at Rynek Staromiejski 35
Tony Halik Museum of Travelers at Franciszkańska 9/11 Street

Collection
The Museum's holdings include works by Marcello Bacciarelli, Artur Grottger, Piotr Michałowski, Juliusz Kossak, Józef Brandt, Jan Matejko, Henryk Rodakowski, Józef Chełmoński, Julian Fałat, Leon Wyczółkowski, Stanisław Wyspiański, Jacek Malczewski, Stanisław Ignacy Witkiewicz, Wojciech Weiss, Józef Mehoffer, Konrad Krzyżanowski, Ferdynand Ruszczyc, Jan Cybis, Zbigniew Pronaszko, Piotr Potworowski, Antoni Fałat, Edward Dwurnik, Zdzisław Beksiński, and Jerzy Duda-Gracz.

Gallery

See also
 National Museum of Poland
 Ministry of Culture and National Heritage (Poland)
 Centre Of Contemporary Art in Torun

References

Footnotes

External links

Official Website
 Departments
 Opening times
Online Auction House

Museums in Kuyavian-Pomeranian Voivodeship
Buildings and structures in Toruń
History museums in Poland
Art museums and galleries in Poland
Registered museums in Poland